Alastair John Lyndhurst Bruce, 5th Baron Aberdare,  (born 2 May 1947), is a British nobleman, and since 2009 a crossbench hereditary Lord Temporal.

Personal life and education
Lord Aberdare is the son of Morys Bruce, 4th Baron Aberdare, and Maud Helen Sarah Dashwood, only daughter of Sir John Dashwood, 10th Baronet. The 5th Lord succeeded his father upon the latter's death in 2005. Aberdare was educated at Eton and Christ Church, Oxford.

He married Elizabeth Mary Culbert Foulkes in 1971, and they have two children: 
Hector Morys Napier Bruce (born 1974)
Sarah Katherine Mary Bruce (born 1976)

House of Lords

In July 2009, Bruce was elected to sit in the House of Lords, following the death of Viscount Bledisloe in May 2009. A by-election took place under the terms of the House of Lords Act 1999, which provided for 92 hereditary peers to keep their seats in the reformed House, with vacancies in their number filled from amongst all non-sitting hereditary peers. The result was announced in the Chamber of the Lords on 15 July 2009, following the voting by 27 of the 29 Crossbench peers eligible to take part. His maiden speech, made on 26 November 2009 during the debate on the Queen's Speech, focused on the transition from education to employment.

Career
 IBM, 1969–1991
 Partner, Bruce Naughton Wade, 1991–1999
 Director, ProbusBNW, 1999–?
 Trustee, National Botanic Garden of Wales, 1994–2006
 Fellow, Royal Society for the encouragement of Arts, Manufactures & Commerce
 Honorary Fellow of Cardiff University since July 2008
 Sub Prior of the Venerable Order of St John of Jerusalem, Priory of Wales.

Offices
Aberdare is president of the Cynon Valley History Society.

References

"Aberdare, Baron (Bruce) (Baron UK 1873)" Debrett's Peerage & Baronetage 1995 London: Debrett's Peerage Limited, 1995, p. 4.
Who's Who 2008, A & C Black, 2008; online edn, Oxford University Press, December 2007.
thePeerage.com

External links

1947 births
Living people
People educated at Eton College
Alumni of Christ Church, Oxford
Crossbench hereditary peers
Eldest sons of British hereditary barons
Alastair
Deputy Lieutenants of Dyfed

Hereditary peers elected under the House of Lords Act 1999